Tambaseyun-e Kuh Mobarak (also Romanized as Tambāseyūn-e Kūh Mobārak; also known as Kooh Mobarak, Kūh-e Mobārak, Kūh-i-Mubarak, Kuhmobarak, Kūh Mobārak, Qal‘eh-ye Kūh-e Mobārak, and Tampāseyūn) is a village in Kangan Rural District, in the Central District of Jask County, Hormozgan Province, Iran. At the 2006 census, its population was 119, in 27 families.

References 

Populated places in Jask County